Siveh Kadeh-ye Sofla (also Romanized as Siveh Kadeh-ye Soflá; also known as Sīb Godā-ye Pā'īn) is a village in Lahijan-e Sharqi Rural District, Lajan District, Piranshahr County, West Azerbaijan Province, Iran. At the 2006 census, its population was 168, in 22 families.

References 

Populated places in Piranshahr County